Federalist No. 25 is an essay by Alexander Hamilton, the twenty-fifth of The Federalist Papers. It was published on December 21, 1787, under the pseudonym Publius, the name under which all The Federalist papers were published. It continues the discussion begun in Federalist No. 24. No. 25 is titled "The Same Subject Continued: The Powers Necessary to the Common Defense Further Considered".

Summary 
Still considering the criticism of maintaining the national forces from Federalist No. 24, Publius now turns to the criticism that the States should provide for the national forces, rather than the Union as has been proposed.  Publius states that this would undermine the purpose of creating a Union, because it would rely on the individual members to support the Union's common defense.  He claims that this would be "oppressive to some States, dangerous to all, and baneful to the Confederacy."

In explaining the danger, Publius demonstrates that the territories of foreign nations surround the entirety of the Union, making the danger common to all the States.  If one state in particular (Publius uses New York as an example) was attacked, it would be forced to provide all of its defense with no guarantee of support from other States.  Publius explains that the States themselves are too prone to power and ambition for any of them to reasonably rely on the provision of defense in a time of crisis.

Later in the essay, Publius shifts back to the general importance of a Union-created military that would remain standing even during times of peace.  He explains that if the national forces could only be summoned during times of war, the Union would leave itself vulnerable to an initial strike.  Without a standing military, the Union would have to "receive the blow before we could even prepare to return it."  Such a system would not be functional if the Union is unable to prepare in advance of military strikes by foreign powers.

References

External links 

 Text of The Federalist No. 25: congress.gov
The Avalon Project, Yale University

25
1787 in American law
1787 essays
1787 in the United States